Black River is an  river on the Upper Peninsula of the U.S. state of Michigan.

All of the river's drainage basin is within Mackinac County, much of it within the Lake Superior State Forest.

Tributaries (from the mouth):
 East Branch Black River
 Borgstrom Creek
 Peters Creek
 Silver Creek
 Bark Creek

References 

Rivers of Michigan
Rivers of Mackinac County, Michigan
Tributaries of Lake Michigan